U2 small nuclear ribonucleoprotein B is a protein that in humans is encoded by the SNRPB2 gene.

The protein encoded by this gene associates with stem loop IV of U2 small nuclear ribonucleoprotein (U2 snRNP) in the presence of snRNP-A'. The encoded protein may play a role in pre-mRNA splicing. Autoantibodies from patients with systemic lupus erythematosus frequently recognize epitopes on the encoded protein. Two transcript variants encoding the same protein have been found for this gene.

References

Further reading